National Route 321 is a national highway of Japan connecting Shimanto and Sukumo in Kochi prefecture, with a total length of 82.3 km (51.14 mi).

References

National highways in Japan
Roads in Kōchi Prefecture